Baynes Lake is an unincorporated rural community on the east shore of Lake Koocanusa, just north of the mouth of the Elk River, in the East Kootenay region of southeastern British Columbia. Off BC Highway 93, the locality is by road about  southEAST of Cranbrook and  southWEST of Fernie.

Name origin
In 1896, Andrew Bain preempted land on the shores of what became known as 
Baynes Lake, the name later being adopted by the community.

Railways
In September 1902, the rail head of the Great Northern Railway (GN) advanced northward through the locality. The Baynes station, which opened in 1904, included a water tank. Passenger service was not available before 1905 or possibly 1906, when Baynes became a flag stop. By 1907, it was a regular stop, for years, the only one between Fernie, BC, and Rexford, Montana. The station served as late as 1935, but had closed by 1936 with the abandonment of the Elko–Rexford section of track that year.

In 1912, the Canadian Pacific Railway (CP) built its Waldo subdivision southward from Caithness, crossing the GN track just south of the station. CP abandoned the route in 1928.

Early community
Mrs Jessie Dilse was the inaugural postmaster 1904–1905. Job opportunities at the Adolph Lumber Company, which established a sawmill site along the eastern shore around 1907, drew many settlers to the locality. The company operated two stores. The meeting hall above one of them hosted a church, dances, school concerts, twice monthly silent movies, and other community events. Both railways served the mill. In 1909, Jennie Adolph became the inaugural school teacher.

When the mill closed in the early 1920s, the population quickly dwindled and workers moved to find employment elsewhere. Many of the remaining residents were farmers or worked in the new portable mills of the area. The post office closed in 1968.

Reservoir
When the reservoir for the Libby Dam in Montana, submerged parts of the Kootenay River valley in the early 1970s, several displaced families were relocated to small building lots in Baynes Lake.

Later community
Nowadays, many of the approximately 160 dwellings are occupied only seasonally. The village includes a community hall, church, volunteer fire hall, general store, and community park.

Climate

Footnotes

References

Populated places in the Regional District of East Kootenay
Populated places established in 1896
Unincorporated settlements in British Columbia